Erik M. Jorgensen is an American biologist, currently teaching and running a microbiology and genetics lab at the University of Utah. He is a Distinguished Professor. He has been a Howard Hughes Medical Institute Investigator since 2005.

References

Year of birth missing (living people)
Living people
University of Utah faculty
21st-century American biologists
Howard Hughes Medical Investigators